The Vuelta a Tenerife is a multi-day road cycling race held annually on the island of Tenerife in Spain.

Winners

References

1956 establishments in Spain
Cycle races in Spain
Men's road bicycle races
Recurring sporting events established in 1956
Sport in Tenerife